Pareuxoa flavicosta is a moth of the family Noctuidae. It is found in Puerto Natales, Tres Puentes, Temuco and Termas de Río Blanco in Chile and Neuquén, Chapelco and San Martín de los Andes in Argentina.

The wingspan is about 35 mm. Adults are on wing from January to April.

External links
 Noctuinae of Chile

Noctuinae